Cape la Hune was a settlement in Newfoundland and Labrador.The community was part of the provincial governments resettlement program, beginning in the 1950's, that saw the residents of many isolated communities relocated to larger communities to reduce costs from ferry and infrastructure services. The former site of Cape la Hune is completely abandoned, with few remnants of the previous buildings remaining.

Populated places in Newfoundland and Labrador
Road-inaccessible communities of Newfoundland and Labrador